The Elbs persulfate oxidation is the organic reaction of phenols with alkaline potassium persulfate to form para-diphenols. The reaction is generally performed in water at room temperatures or below, using equimolar quantities of reagents.

Several reviews have been published.

Scope and mechanism
The reaction is disadvantaged by moderate to low chemical yields with recovery of starting material and complete consumption of the persulfate. It is suggested that the phenol in many cases is a catalyst converting the persulfate into a sulfate. Despite this, the Elbs reaction remains generally useful in a research setting, as it is simple to perform and is tolerant of a wide range of other functional groups, which are not oxidised under these conditions.

A reaction mechanism has been postulated which accounts for the observed para substitution featuring the tautomeric para carbanion of the starting phenolate ion: It begins with nucleophilic displacement on the peroxide oxygen of the peroxodisulfate (peroxydisulfate) ion, to give an intermediate sulfate group (3), which is then hydrolyzed to the hydroxyl group.

See also
 Boyland–Sims oxidation
 Dakin reaction

References

Organic oxidation reactions
Name reactions

Add the following:
E. J. Behrman, The Elbs & Boyland-Sims Oxidations: An Updated Literature Survey.  Mini-Rev. Org. Chem, 18(2021)621-625.